Robert Nathan "Red" Brown (April 14, 1907 – June 8, 1992) was an American college basketball coach. He was the head basketball coach at Davis & Elkins College from 1947 to 1950 and West Virginia University from 1950 to 1954.

References

1907 births
1992 deaths
American men's basketball coaches
Davis & Elkins Senators men's basketball coaches
Davis & Elkins Senators men's basketball players
Forwards (basketball)
West Virginia Mountaineers athletic directors
West Virginia Mountaineers men's basketball coaches
American men's basketball players